Ulwe  (also Ulwa, Ulva, or Ulawe) is a node of Navi Mumbai situated beside Belapur and Nerul and home to Navi Mumbai International Airport officially named DB Patil International Airport. It is developed and maintained by CIDCO. It is located in Raigad district. It is soon going to come under the purview of the Panvel Municipal Corporation.

Ulwe has a sports complex with football, badminton, hockey, swimming pool, and indoor stadium. Ulwe has seen drastic increase in property rates due to its geographical location and proximity to the under-construction Navi Mumbai International Airport expected to be functional by December 2024, Seawoods-Uran railway line expected to be fully functional by December 2022, and MTHL Trans Harbour Link from Sewri to Chirle village in Nhava Sheva expected to be functional by September 2023.

Ulwe has big land parcels belonging to Reliance Industries Ltd. on which big residential and commercial activities are expected to start. It has 3 railway stations named Kharkopar, Bamandongri, and Targhar railway stations.

Being a newly developing node of Navi Mumbai, many buildings and constructions are being developed in Ulwe. CIDCO buildings are also being constructed in there.

A coastal road is also proposed which will act as a connector between the Mumbai Trans Harbour Link and the new NMIA (Navi Mumbai International Airport), and another arm of the coastal road will connect the sea link to JNPT. The sea link has its first interchange at Shivajinagar, Ulwe, and second at Chirle near Dronagiri node in Navi Mumbai.

Ulwe Port
Ulwe is situated along Panvel Creek and the old village, among 10 others, was abandoned to make way for the new Navi Mumbai Airport. It is at a distance of 6 miles from Panvel. There is a wharf at Ulwe. The old pier is in a dilapidated condition. This port is not approachable to big steamers. There are two seasonal sailing vessels for passenger traffic. Mostly these vessels are used for carrying vegetables and fruits to Mumbai. The chief goods exported from Ulwe are fruits, vegetables, rice, grain, salt, firewood, and sand.

Modern History
City and Industrial Development Corporation (CIDCO) a registered company under the company's act of 1972 and is responsible for development of the Ulwe node and all the other nodes in Navi Mumbai. The other nodes in Navi Mumbai are Vashi, Sanpada, Nerul, Seawoods, Kamothe, Kharghar, Panvel, Turbhe, Airoli, Dronagiri, and Ulwe. Originally land parcels were owned by farmers in this node. CIDCO brought land from farmers and has been developing these land parcels. The Ulwe node has a river (Ulwe River) passing through the proposed Navi Mumbai International Airport. To the north east of the node lies the Gahdi river. The node also has more than 300 hectares of mangroves.

Environmental Context
The node in the environmental perspective is very rich, with 300+ hectares of mangroves and two rivers. Rivers Ulwe and Ghadi pass through the Ulwe node in the proposed international airport area. Construction and development has only been possible after containing and diverting these rivers and mangroves. Approximately 200 hectares of mangroves will be destroyed for the upcoming international airport. The environmental clearance for the project has been given based on relocation or re plantation of these 200 hectare mangroves. CIDCO has proposed a mangrove park north of the airport site. The river Ghadi is to be diverted altering its meeting point in the Panvel Creek. Environmentalists fear flooding of the Panvel area because of this alteration.

Karnala Bird Sanctuary is just below the Dronagiri node, southeast of the node. The bird sanctuary is small, approximately 11.2 km. square. Along with Sanjay Gandhi National Park and Tungareshwar Sanctuary is the boundary of Mumbai Metropolitan Region. Dronagiri Fort is located in the southernmost tip of Dronagiri spread over an area of 17 km. square and is bound by Karanjha River on the southeast. It lies between the town of Uran and Karanjha. Port based activities take place around the area.

References

Nodes of Navi Mumbai